Carla Rossi Balado (born 11 May 1985) is a Mexican football manager and former player. She is the current manager of Querétaro F.C. (women). During her career as player she represented Mexico from 2004 to 2008.

Career

Early career
Carla Rossi was born in Guadalajara, Jalisco on 11 May 1985, her father is Italian and her mother from Argentina.

Rossi played college football at the Universidad de Guadalajara.

Club career
When Club Tijuana established its female section in 2015 to play in the Women's Premier Soccer League, Rossi was part of the team.

International career
Rossi represented Mexico from 2004 to 2008.

Managerial career
Rossi was part of Andrea Rodebaugh's staff in Tijuana and assumed the head coach position for the 2019–20 season when Rodebaugh left for a job at the FIFA as Development Official for the Americas.

With Xolos, Rossi managed to qualify the team to the playoffs for the first time in the club's history. In May 2020, Rossi left Tijuana and was replaced by Franky Oviedo.

In June 2020, Rossi was presented as the new manager of Querétaro Women. In her first tournament with Querétaro, the team finished in fourth place.

Managerial statistics

References

1985 births
Living people
Footballers from Guadalajara, Jalisco
Mexican women's footballers
Mexico women's international footballers
Mexican football managers
Women's association football managers
Liga MX Femenil managers
Mexican people of Italian descent
Mexican people of Argentine descent
Sportspeople of Argentine descent
Women's association footballers not categorized by position
Mexican footballers